Johan Nilsson i Skottlandshus  (21 August 1873 – 16 March 1963) was a Swedish farmer, politician, governor of Kristianstad County, and the tenth Speaker of Första kammaren of the Riksdag.

References

Speakers of Första kammaren
Members of the Första kammaren
County governors of Sweden
Knights of the Order of Charles XIII
1873 births
1963 deaths